Discourse About the Provision of Money is a 1502 book by Italian political scientist and writer Niccolò Machiavelli.

References

1502 books
Finance books
Works by Niccolò Machiavelli